Angurtlar may refer to:
 Angurtlar-e Olya
 Angurtlar-e Sofla